Sport Club Americano, commonly known as Americano, was a Brazilian football club from Porto Alegre, Rio Grande do Sul state. They won the Campeonato Gaúcho once.

History
The club was founded on June 4, 1912, as Sport Club Hispano-Americano, changing the name to Sport Club Americano in the following year. They won the Campeonato Gaúcho in 1928. In the 1940s, the club merged with a team owned by a group of students, and it was renamed to Americano-Universitário, but the merge was a failure, and the club folded.

Achievements

 Campeonato Gaúcho:
 Winners (1): 1928

Stadium

Sport Club Americano played their home games at Estádio dos Eucaliptos. The stadium had a maximum capacity of 20,000 people.

References

Association football clubs established in 1912
Defunct football clubs in Rio Grande do Sul
1912 establishments in Brazil
1940s disestablishments in Brazil